Khomeriki is a Georgian surname. Notable people with the surname include:

 Nikolay Khomeriki (born 1975), Russian film director and screenwriter
 Noe Khomeriki (1883–1924), Georgian politician

Georgian-language surnames